The Harborne Railway was a short standard gauge railway line constructed for residential travel from the Harborne area into the centre of Birmingham, England. The line opened in 1874, and was worked by the London and North Western Railway. As business developed, an increasingly frequent passenger service was operated, at its peak thirty trains each way daily.

In the 1920s and later it suffered from road bus service competition and it closed to passenger trains in 1934. A private siding connection had been made to Mitchells & Butlers Brewery, but the line closed completely in 1963.

Conception
In 1866 Harborne was a distinct community outside Birmingham, with a population of over 22,000. The Harborne Railway was planned to serve certain suburbs of Birmingham, bringing in business people from the well-to-do areas of Lapal (near Halesowen) and Harborne. However, there was major opposition to the Lapal end of the scheme, and the promoters cut back their scheme to a route of just under  miles. The Harborne Railway Company got its Act of Parliament on 28 June 1866. Authorised capital was £100,000.

The company concluded an arrangement with the London and North Western Railway to work the line for 50% of receipts. The line would join the LNWR Stour Valley Line at Monument Lane Junction, later renamed Harborne Junction. The branch was a single line.

The station at Harborne opened, and passenger traffic commenced on 10 August 1874. There was a Sunday service at first but there were complaints that the Sabbath was being disturbed and the Company withdrew the trains. Goods services started on 3 October 1874.

The first passenger train service was of six each way on weekdays and three on Sundays. The early departure of the last train into Birmingham was at 19:20, which attracted adverse comment at the time.

In 1879 Harborne station platform was extended, and the junction with the Stour Valley main line was renamed Harborne Junction. In 1893, the platform at Harborne was extended, in order to handle longer trains. There was a turntable and a run-round loop, but both were practically unused, and were later removed.

In 1897 Icknield Port Road station was moved west of the road in its name; the first station had been between the bridges for that road and Barford Road; when it was desired to lengthen the platform, it could not be extended in its old location.

In 1903 Rotton Park Road station was made into an island platform with a passing loop, enabling the train frequency to be improved. As part of the layout alterations, a siding spur into Mitchell and Butler's brewery was provided, and much traffic resulted.

Financial performance
Early financial operating performance seemed good, but heavy interest on capital expenditure caught up with the company, and a receiver in bankruptcy was appointed on 26 July 1879. The receiver was discharged on 31 December 1900. During the whole of its separate existence dividends were never high, although between 1919 and 1922 a dividend of 3% was paid. The Harborne Railway Company was absorbed by the new London Midland and Scottish Railway at the Grouping of 1923 under the Railways Act 1921. The LNWR had worked the line throughout its existence.

Train service
The early passenger train frequency was gradually improved over the years, and in 1897 when there was still no passing loop on the branch, there were twenty trains daily in each direction. The service was an early example of a regular interval service, with an hourly departure in each direction. By April 1920 the service had further increased to 30 down and 31 up trains daily.

Decline
In the 1920s and 1930s bus competition, taking a shorter route into the city centre, hit the usage of the line, and the LMS felt the necessity for economies. The Harborne branch closed to passengers on 26 November 1934.

Coal continued to be carried, but complete closure of the branch took place on 4 November 1963. After closure the track was removed and stations demolished. See paragraph below for "Relics" .

Location list

 Harborne; opened 10 August 1874; closed 26 November 1934;
 Hagley Road; opened 10 August 1874; closed 26 November 1934;
 Rotton Park Road; opened 10 August 1874; closed 26 November 1934;
 Icknield Port Road; opened 10 August 1874; relocated 1897; closed 26 November 1934;
 Monument Lane Junction, later named Harborne Junction.

Features

Relics

The bridge that carried the railway over Park Hill Road has survived, and now forms the start of the walkway. Most of the bridges that carried roads over the line (e.g. Woodbourne Road, Hagley Road) have also survived. Discarded sleepers can be found alongside the walkway. Although none of the stations survive, the name plate from Harborne signal box does, and can be found in Harborne library.

After Harborne station closed, the site was cleared and redeveloped. Frensham Way was built on the site, and now there are no relics that suggest the site was once a railway station. The only hints to the site's previous use are "Station Road", and a housing development called "The Sidings", which was built recently on the site of the old turntable.

Unlike Harborne station, the site of Hagley Road station was not redeveloped. The station buildings were demolished, but some bricks from the station can be found in the undergrowth, and the site of the goods yard is still there, but it is overgrown. A row of cottages still face the line.

Rotton Park Road's buildings were cleared as early as 1934. When the island platform was demolished in that year, a mound was left. Although overgrown, it can still be seen today. A concrete support that used to support the wooden footbridge can be seen at the site of the station

Today, there are no clues to a station's existence at Icknield Port Road. The cutting where the station was located was filled in circa 2008. Until then it was possible to walk under Icknield Port Poad through the old bridge. It was also possible to see the retaining wall that bordered the path from the road to the platform. Icknield Port Road station closed in 1931, a few years before the other stations. The line from here to the junction with the Stour Valley line used to run in a cutting, which has been filled in. The girder bridge that carried the line over the Stour Valley canal was removed, but the brick supports survive.

Pictures

References

External links
 1953 one inch to mile map showing route and two closed stations

The Railways of Warwickshire: Birmingham New Street to Harborne

Closed railway lines in the West Midlands (region)
Rail transport in Birmingham, West Midlands
Railway companies established in 1866
Railway lines opened in 1874
London, Midland and Scottish Railway constituents
1866 establishments in England
Harborne
Rail trails in England